Windley Key is an island in the upper Florida Keys in Monroe County, Florida, United States. U.S. 1 (the Overseas Highway) crosses it at approximately mile markers 84–85.5, between Plantation Key and Upper Matecumbe Key. All of the key is within the Village of Islamorada as of November 4, 1997, when it was incorporated.

The key is home to Theater of the Sea, a popular tourist attraction since 1946. It also contains a Florida State Park Service geological site, and the popular Holiday Isle resort.

History
Prior to the building of the Overseas Railroad, the site consisted of two separate islands known as the Umbrella Keys. Railway construction required the intervening space to be filled; it then became known as Windley Key, after an early settler. Several quarries operated there for many years, supplying building stone locally known as "keystone". The railway station on Windley Key was called Quarry.

References

Islands of the Florida Keys
Islands of Monroe County, Florida
Islamorada, Florida
Islands of Florida